Ozenoxacin, sold under the brand names Ozanex and Xepi, is a quinolone antibiotic used for the treatment of impetigo.  A 1% topical cream is approved for treatment of impetigo in Canada and in the United States.

Ozenoxacin is active against some bacteria that have developed resistance to fluoroquinolone antibiotics.

References

External links 
 

Quinolone antibiotics
Cyclopropanes
Carboxylic acids
Aminopyridines